The Treaty of Zurich was signed by the Austrian Empire, the French Empire, and the Kingdom of Sardinia on 10 November 1859. The agreement was a reaffirmation of the terms of the preliminary peace of Villafranca, which brought the Austro-Sardinian War to an official close. The treaty actually consisted of three separate treaties – a treaty between France and Austria, which reaffirmed the terms of the preliminary peace, re-established peace between the two emperors, and ceded Lombardy to France.  A second treaty, between France and Sardinia, saw France cede Lombardy to Sardinia.  The third treaty, signed by all three powers, re-established a state of peace between Austria and Sardinia.

In the French-Austrian treaty, both countries agreed to work towards a confederation of Italian states, including Venice, under the honorary presidence of the Pope (art. 18), which never happened.

See also 
Treaty of Turin (1860) 
Treaty of Vienna (1866)

External links
The Valtelline (1603-1639) - Chapter II
Heraldry in Pre-Unification Italy
Chapter XI - Hungarian Soldiers in Foreign Armies
Encarta Encyclopedia - Italy
The Project Gutenberg eBook - The Liberation of Italy by Countess Evelyn Martinengo-Cesaresco

Zurich
1859 treaties
Treaties of the Second French Empire
Treaties of the Kingdom of Sardinia
1859 in France
History of Zürich
1859 in the Austrian Empire
1859 in the Kingdom of Sardinia
Austrian Empire–France relations
Austrian Empire–Kingdom of Sardinia relations
France–Kingdom of Sardinia relations
November 1859 events